The Wrens were an American doo-wop vocal group from The Bronx, New York City. They are best known for their song "Come Back My Love".

The Wrens began in the Morrisania section of the Bronx in 1950. Neighborhood friends Waldo Champen (tenor, usually referred to as "Champ Rollow"), Francis "Frenchie" Concepcion (tenor/baritone lead), Archangel "Archie" Oropeza (baritone), and Raoul McLeod (bass) sang together under this name for around two years. They slowly drifted apart. 

Concepcion was determined to make the group last, and in 1952, he recruited two new members; tenor George Magnezid and bass James "Archie" Archer. They sang as a trio in the community center of P.S. 99 for a couple of months before deciding to expand to a quartet by adding tenor Bobby Mansfield. At the time, Mansfield was about fifteen years old and attending Morris High School in the Bronx. Oropeza was around the same age and Concepcion and Magnezid were already out of school.

In 1954, they heard about a contest that was being held by an arranger/pianist named Freddy Johnson at the old CBS building. The Wrens entered and won, and Johnson became their manager.

Rama Records owner George Goldner arranged a session for the Wrens that took place on November 21, 1954. They recorded four songs that day: “Love’s Something That’s Made For Two” (led by Mansfield), “Beggin’ For Love” (fronted by Concepcion), “Come Back My Love”, and “Eleven Roses” (both by Mansfield). The piano player was Johnson, who provided the other session musicians. However, he and the Wrens parted company soon after the session, and from then on, Goldner used the Jimmy Wright Orchestra to back them. James "Archie" Archer left in 1955 and was replaced by Joseph "Rocky" Washington, who later recorded in another doo-wop group, The Performers. Further recordings, including six single releases on Rama, were unsuccessful and Mansfield left in 1956 to pursue a solo career.

In 1998, The Wrens were inducted into the United In Group Harmony Association's Hall of Fame.

James "Archie" Archer died On June 22nd, 1999.

George Magnezid died on December 9th, 2003, In Westchester County, New York, Aged 69.

Bobby Mansfield died on September 15, 2013, in The Bronx, New York, aged 76.

The Performers were a four-man Canadian doo-wop group, formed by Joseph "Rocky" Washington of The Wrens and Perry Heyward of The Sparrows on the Jay Dee label, after the breakup of The Sparrows.

References

Wrens, The
Morrisania, Bronx
Musical groups from the Bronx